Marshall Pinkney Wilder Locke  (March 12, 1857 – March 6, 1940) was a Major League Baseball outfielder for the 1884 Indianapolis Hoosiers.

External links
Baseball-Reference page

1857 births
1940 deaths
19th-century baseball players
Baseball players from Ohio
Major League Baseball outfielders
Indianapolis Hoosiers (AA) players
Omaha Omahogs players
Keokuk Hawkeyes players
Birmingham (minor league baseball) players
People from Ashland, Ohio